Ladislav Józsa (16 January 1948 – 12 December 1999) was a former Slovak football striker. Born in Hungary, his family moved from Hungary to Sládkovičovo. He was known as free kick specialist for his hard shots. He became the top scorer of the Czechoslovak First League three times, scoring 21 goals at 1972–73, 17 goals at 1973–74 and 18 goals at 1976–77 season. He overall played 225 matches and scored 108 goals at the Top Division.

Józsa made his only appearance for the Czechoslovakia national football team in a 1–0 home win against Turkey on 7 September 1977.

Honours
Czechoslovak Cup
1977, 1979

Top goalscorer of the Czechoslovak First League
1972–73, 1973–74, 1976–77

External links
 Ladislav Józsa at The Football Association of the Czech Republic
rsfa.org

1948 births
1999 deaths
Slovak footballers
Czechoslovak footballers
Czechoslovakia international footballers
Association football forwards
FC DAC 1904 Dunajská Streda players
People from Bács-Kiskun County
FC Lokomotíva Košice players
TTS Trenčín players